Meydan-e Mozaffarkhan (also Romanized as Meydān-e Moz̧affarkhān; also known as Meydān) is a village in Siyah Mansur Rural District, in the Central District of Bijar County, Kurdistan Province, Iran. At the 2006 census, its population was 217, in 55 families. The village is populated by Azerbaijanis.

References 

Towns and villages in Bijar County
Azerbaijani settlements in Kurdistan Province